Kennedy Peak or Mount Kennedy or variations may refer to one of a number of notable peaks named Kennedy. These are generally named after John F. Kennedy, U.S. president during 1960–1963.  It is also possible that some may be named after other people named Kennedy.

The peaks of this name are:

References